Yurii Tomyn (born December 23, 1988) is a Ukrainian volleyball player, a member of the Ukraine men's national volleyball team and Epicentr-Podoliany.

Career
Yurii Tomyn started his professional career in Lokomotyv Kharkiv.

He was a member of the Ukraine men's national volleyball team in 2019 Men's European Volleyball Championship.

Sporting achievements

Clubs 
Ukrainian Championship:
 x7  2010/11, 2011/12, 2012/13, 2013/14, 2014/15, 2015/16, 2018/19
Ukrainian Cup:
 x7  2010/11, 2011/12, 2012/13, 2013/14, 2014/15, 2015/16, 2018/19
Ukrainian Supercup:
 x3  2017/18, 2018/2019, 2019/2020

National Team 
 2017  European League

Individual 
 2019/2020 MVP  Ukrainian Supercup
 2018/2019 Best Opposite  Ukrainian Cup

References

External links

Ukrainian men's volleyball players
VC Lokomotyv Kharkiv players
VC Barkom-Kazhany players
VC Epitsentr-Podoliany players
1988 births
Living people
Sportspeople from Khmelnytskyi Oblast
21st-century Ukrainian people